Teretosporea are a proposed basal Holozoa clade in which Ichthyosporea and Corallochytrium emerged with the Filozoa as sister clade. Since it is close to the divergence between the main lineages of Fungi and Animals, the study of Teretosporea can provide crucial information on the divergent lifestyles of these groups.

With the inclusion of Syssomonas there remained very little support for the Teretosporea, and Corralychtrium appears to be a more derived Holozoa. The alternate phylogeny is the Pluriformea hypothesis.

References

Opisthokont unranked clades
Holozoa